or  is a yellowish orange citrus hybrid fruit, a group of cultivars of Citrus natsudaidai, which were discovered in 1740 in the Yamaguchi prefecture of Japan.

Names 
Amanatsu  means "sweet summer" in Japanese.

Description 
Natsumikan is about the size of grapefruit and oblate in shape. The fruit contains 12 segments and about 30 seeds. The rough textured fruit is easy to peel and is commonly eaten fresh. It is also used for wide variety of products ranging from marmalades to alcoholic beverages.

Cultivation 
Natsumikan is grown commercially in Japan, notably in Yamaguchi, Kumamoto and Ehime prefecture. The city of Hagi is famous for its natsumikans, particularly when used in natsumikan juice and ice cream.

Yamaguchi Prefecture takes such pride in their natsumikan industry that the typically white crash barriers of Japan were changed to a befitting orange.

Genetics 
The natsumikan tree is believed to be genetically derived from the pomelo (Citrus grandis or Citrus maxima).

Medicine 
Researchers found that immature natsumikan peel is beneficial for the treatment of chronic allergic dermatitis in mice.

Gallery

See also 
 Citrus tristeza virus
 Daidai
 Japanese citrus
 Mikan

References

Further reading

Natsudaidai at the Citrus Variety Collection

Citrus
Citrus hybrids
Japanese fruit
Taxa named by Bunzō Hayata